The General Conference Corporation of Seventh-day Adventists is the governing organization of the Seventh-day Adventist Church. Its headquarters is located in Silver Spring, Maryland and oversees the church in directing its various divisions and leadership, as well as doctrinal matters.

The General Conference, which is overseen by an executive committee and an elected President of the General Conference, is the administrative head of the global church. The denomination is organized in a representative form of church government, which means authority arises from the membership of local churches. In addition to administering their own congregations, churches send representatives to vote on matters and leaders in a shared local unit of administration. They vote also on who will represent them in a large area, with further representation selected at each successively larger administrative region. Finally, the General Conference elects the executive committee and officers who hold its authority between the decisions of the quinquennial General Conference Session.

Major entities

Four units of church structure provide organization. They are interdependent while holding some unique authorities and consisting of specific constituencies.

The local church and its members.
The local conference (in some cases, a field) is made up of a number of churches in an area such as a state, province, or territory.
The union conference (in some cases, a union mission) is made up of conferences and fields in a larger geographical area.
The General Conference administers the worldwide direction of the Seventh-day Adventist Church. The General Conference includes 13 regional administrative sections, called divisions.

Divisions and Attached Unions/Fields

Meetings

The General Conference holds three meetings in which leaders from around the world gather to discuss church issues and finances.  While two meetings meet annually, usually at the world headquarters in Silver Spring, Maryland, the third meets every five years in a selected city.

 Spring Meeting meets every April
 Annual Council meets every October
 General Conference Session meets quinquennially in a selected city

See also

 Government of the Seventh-day Adventist Church
 List of presidents of the General Conference of Seventh-day Adventists

References

External links
 Adventist Yearbook The official organizational directory
 World Divisions map and links
 General Conference Committee Minutes from Adventist Archives

 
Ellen G. White Estate
History of the Seventh-day Adventist Church